Laryovo is the name of two rural localities in Russia:
Laryovo, Moscow, a village in Sosenskoye Settlement of the federal city of Moscow
Laryovo, Moscow Oblast, a village in Fedoskinskoye Rural Settlement of Mytishchinsky District in Moscow Oblast;

References